Celestyn may refer to:

Celestyn Chołodecki (1816–1867), Polish member of the szlachta (noble) family of Chołodecki
Celestyn Czaplic (1723–1804), Polish–Lithuanian szlachcic, politician, writer and a poet
Krzysztof Celestyn Mrongovius (1764–1855), Protestant pastor, writer, philosopher, linguist and translator
Celestyn Myślenta (1588–1653), Polish Lutheran theologian and rector of the University of Königsberg

See also
Celestin (disambiguation)
Celestina (disambiguation)
Celestine (disambiguation)
Celestini, surname page
Celestino, surname page